The 2017 Honda Indy Toronto was an IndyCar Series event held on July 16, 2017 in Toronto, Ontario, Canada. The race served as the 12th round of the 2017 IndyCar Series season. Frenchman Simon Pagenaud qualified on pole position, while American Josef Newgarden took victory in the race.

Pre-Race
Prior to the race, Schmidt Peterson Motorsports elected to replace Mikhail Aleshin in the No. 7 car, instead opting for veteran driver Sebastián Saavedra. The reasons for the change were undisclosed by the team.

Qualifying
Qualifying was held on Saturday, July 15. Simon Pagenaud secured pole position, setting a new track record time of 58.9124 at an average speed of 109.14 mph (175.64 km/h). Alongside him on the front row was Graham Rahal. The remained of the top six was rounded out by Hélio Castroneves, Will Power, Scott Dixon, and James Hinchcliffe.

Qualifying saw two incidents during the course of its several sessions. During the second group of round 1 qualifying, Esteban Gutiérrez suffered a heavy crash in turn 11 that placed doubt on his participation in the race, both due to damage to the car and due to Gutiérrez displaying concussion-like symptoms. However, the car was repaired, and Guitérrez was cleared by IndyCar's doctors, allowing him to participate in the race. A second, more minor incident occurred in round 2 qualifying, when J. R. Hildebrand made contact with the wall in turn 8.

Race
The race was held on Sunday, July 16. At the start, Hélio Castroneves managed to pass both Simon Pagenaud and Graham Rahal going into turn 1, giving him the lead of the race. Behind them, Scott Dixon managed to get to the inside of Will Power to move to third. However, as cars approached turn 3, Dixon moved wide to avoid hitting the back of Rahal, in the process making contact with Power and forcing him into the outside wall. Power's car suffered terminal suspension damage, relegating him to a last place finish. Dixon limped around the track with a flat tire, which, after repairs, dropped him to the tail-end of the field. He would then be assessed a drive-through penalty for entering a closed pit-lane. The incident brought out the race's first caution period.

Racing resumed on lap 6, with Castroneves leading Pagenaud, Rahal, Josef Newgarden, and James Hinchcliffe. The top five remained unchanged until lap 20, when Spencer Pigot, who had charged through the field, managed to move around Hinchcliffe. Shortly thereafter, drivers began making their first pit stops, including Hinchcliffe, Alexander Rossi, and Josef Newgarden. Just as Newgarden entered the pits, Tony Kanaan nosed into the wall in turn 1, bringing out the race's second caution, forcing the leaders and anyone else who had not pitted to make their first stop under caution and secede track position. Newgarden proved the biggest beneficiary of the caution, moving into the lead once the leaders came into pit lane. Behind him were Ed Jones, who had not yet pitted, Charlie Kimball, Rossi, and Hinchcliffe.

Racing resumed on lap 27 with the top five remaining intact. Further back, Takuma Sato suffered front wing damage and a punctured tire, forcing him to pit again. On lap 29, Jones began to fall back in the field due to his worn tires, losing position first to Kimball, then to Rossi, Hinchcliffe, and Marco Andretti before finally coming in to pit on lap 33. Several drivers began to make their second pit stops shortly thereafter, including Carlos Muñoz, Scott Dixon, and second-place running Kimball. This promoted Rossi to second, but Newgarden continued to extend his lead.

The running order remained the same until the leaders made their pit-stops at lap 54, when Newgarden led the entire top five into the pits. Max Chilton briefly inherited the lead before handing the lead over to Pagenaud with his stop on lap later. Pagenaud led until lap 57 when he pitted, allowing Newgarden to return to the lead of the race. The order now ran Newgarden, Rossi, Hinchcliffe, Dixon, Andretti, though Dixon would pit for the final time on lap 61, promoting Ryan Hunter-Reay into the top 5, though with heavy pressure from Pagenaud behind. The top five remained the same until lap 81, when Hunter-Reay ran wide at turn 7, allowing Pagenaud to move ahead for position. Up front, despite dealing with traffic from a dueling Takuma Sato and Conor Daly, Josef Newgarden held on to take his second victory of the 2017 season by a comfortable margin of 1.87 seconds over Alexander Rossi, while James Hinchcliffe came across the line third. Marco Andretti secured his first top 5 finish in IndyCar since the 2015 MAVTV 500 with his fourth-place finish.

In the point standings, Scott Dixon remained in the lead of the championship, but his lead dropped to only three points over Hélio Castroneves. Simon Pagenaud remained in third place, while Newgarden moved past his teammate Will Power thanks to his victory.

Results

Qualifying

Source for individual rounds:

Race results

Notes
 Points include 1 point for leading at least 1 lap during a race, an additional 2 points for leading the most race laps, and 1 point for Pole Position.

Source for time gaps:

Championship standings

Driver standings

Manufacturer standings

 Note: Only the top five positions are included.

References

External links
 Official race broadcast

Honda Indy Toronto
Honda Indy Toronto
Honda Indy Toronto
2017
July 2017 sports events in Canada